The British Hallmarking Council (BHC) is the organisation responsible for supervising hallmarking in the United Kingdom. It is a non-departmental public body of the Department for Business, Energy and Industrial Strategy (BEIS).

The BHC was created under the Hallmarking Act 1973 to oversee the activities of the four remaining assay offices (located in London, Birmingham, Sheffield and Edinburgh). The costs of its operations are met entirely by the four offices.

References

External links
 British Hallmarking Council website

Department for Business, Energy and Industrial Strategy
Non-departmental public bodies of the United Kingdom government